Gadolinium(III) oxide (archaically gadolinia) is an inorganic compound with the formula Gd2O3. It is one of the most commonly available forms of the rare-earth element gadolinium, derivatives of which are potential contrast agents for magnetic resonance imaging.

Structure 

Gadolinium oxide adopts two structures. The cubic (cI80, Ia), No. 206) structure is similar to that of manganese(III) oxide and heavy trivalent lanthanide sesquioxides. The cubic structure features two types of gadolinium sites, each with a coordination number of 6 but with different coordination geometries. The second polymorph is monoclinic (Pearson symbol mS30, space group C2/m, No. 12). At room temperature, the cubic structure is more stable. The phase change to the monoclinic structure takes place at 1200 °C. Above 2100 °C to the melting point at 2420 °C, a hexagonal phase dominates.

Preparation and chemistry 
Gadolinium oxide can be formed by thermal decomposition of the hydroxide, nitrate, carbonate, or oxalates. Gadolinium oxide forms on the surface of gadolinium metal.

Gadolinium oxide is a rather basic oxide, indicated by its ready reaction with carbon dioxide to give carbonates. It dissolves readily in the common mineral acids with the complication that the oxalate, fluoride, sulfate and phosphate are very insoluble in water and may coat the grains of oxide, thereby preventing the complete dissolution.

Nanoparticles of Gd2O3 
Several methods are known for the synthesis of gadolinium oxide nanoparticles, mostly based on precipitation of the hydroxide by the reaction of gadolinium ions with hydroxide, followed by thermal dehydration to the oxide. The nanoparticles are always coated with a protective material to avoid the formation of larger polycrystalline aggregates.

Nanoparticles of gadolinium oxide is a potential contrast agent for magnetic resonance imaging (MRI). A dextran-coated preparation of 20–40 nm sized gadolinium oxide particles had a relaxivity of 4.8 s−1mM−1 per gadolinium ion at 7.05 T (an unusually high field compared to the clinically used MRI scanners which mostly range from 0.5 to 3 T). Smaller particles, between 2 and 7 nm, were tested as an MRI agent.

References 

Gadolinium compounds
Sesquioxides